Pope Francis (born Jorge Mario Bergoglio on 17 December 1936) is the head of the Catholic Church, the bishop of Rome and sovereign of the Vatican City State. Francis is the first pope to be a member of the Society of Jesus (Jesuits), the first from the Americas, the first from the Southern Hemisphere, and the first pope from outside Europe since the 8th century papacy of Syrian pope Gregory III.

Born in Buenos Aires, Argentina, Bergoglio worked for a time as a bouncer and a janitor as a young man before training to be a chemist and working as a technician in a food science laboratory. After recovering from a severe illness, he was inspired to join the Jesuits in 1958. He was ordained a Catholic priest in 1969, and from 1973 to 1979 was the Jesuit provincial superior in Argentina. He became the Archbishop of Buenos Aires in 1998 and was created a cardinal in 2001 by Pope John Paul II. He led the Argentine Church during the December 2001 riots in Argentina. The administrations of Néstor Kirchner and Cristina Fernández de Kirchner considered him to be a political rival. Following the resignation of Pope Benedict XVI on 28 February 2013, a papal conclave elected Bergoglio as his successor on 13 March. He chose Francis as his papal name in honor of Saint Francis of Assisi. Throughout his public life, Francis has been noted for his humility, emphasis on God's mercy, international visibility as pope, concern for the poor, and commitment to interreligious dialogue. He is credited with having a less formal approach to the papacy than his predecessors, for instance choosing to reside in the Domus Sanctae Marthae guesthouse rather than in the papal apartments of the Apostolic Palace used by previous popes.

Francis maintains the views of the Church regarding the ordination of women as priests, but has initiated dialogue on the possibility of deaconesses and has made women full members of dicasteries in the Roman Curia. He maintains that the Church should be more open and welcoming for members of the LGBT community, and has called for the decriminalization of homosexuality worldwide. Francis is an outspoken critic of unbridled capitalism and free market economics, consumerism, and overdevelopment; he advocates taking action on climate change, a focus of his papacy. In the encyclical Fratelli tutti, Francis termed the death penalty "inadmissible" and committed the Catholic Church to its global abolition. In international diplomacy, he helped to restore full diplomatic relations between the United States and Cuba, supported the cause of refugees during the European and Central American migrant crises, and made a deal with China to define how much influence the nation has in appointing their Catholic bishops. He has faced criticism from theological conservatives on many questions, especially what some interpret as his suggestion in a footnote of Amoris laetitia that divorced and remarried Catholics may be admitted to receive the Eucharist.

Early years 

Jorge Mario Bergoglio was born on 17 December 1936 in Flores, a neighborhood of Buenos Aires. He was the eldest of five children of Mario José Bergoglio (1908–1959) and Regina María Sívori (1911–1981). Mario Bergoglio was an Italian immigrant accountant born in Portacomaro (Province of Asti) in Italy's Piedmont region. Regina Sívori was a housewife born in Buenos Aires to a family of northern Italian (Piedmontese-Genoese) origin. Mario José's family left Italy in 1929 to escape the fascist rule of Benito Mussolini. According to María Elena Bergoglio (born 1948), the pope's only living sibling, they did not emigrate for economic reasons. His other siblings were Oscar Adrián (1938–deceased), Marta Regina (1940–2007), and Alberto Horacio (1942–2010). Two great-nephews, Antonio and Joseph, died in a traffic collision. His niece, Cristina Bergoglio, is a painter based in Madrid, Spain.

In the sixth grade, Bergoglio attended Wilfrid Barón de los Santos Ángeles, a school of the Salesians of Don Bosco, in Ramos Mejía, Buenos Aires Province. He attended the technical secondary school Escuela Técnica Industrial N° 27 Hipólito Yrigoyen, named after a past Argentine president, and graduated with a chemical technician's diploma (not a master's degree in chemistry, as some media outlets incorrectly reported). In that capacity, he spent several years working in the food section of Hickethier-Bachmann Laboratory, where he worked under Esther Ballestrino. Prior to working as a chemical technician, Bergoglio had also worked as a bar bouncer and as a janitor sweeping floors.

When he was 21 years old, he suffered from life-threatening pneumonia and three cysts. He had part of a lung excised shortly afterwards. Bergoglio has been a lifelong supporter of San Lorenzo de Almagro football club. Bergoglio is also a fan of the films of Tita Merello, neorealism, and tango dancing, with a fondness for the traditional music of Argentina and Uruguay known as the milonga.

Jesuit (1958–2013) 
Bergoglio found his vocation to the priesthood while he was on his way to celebrate the Spring Day. He passed by a church to go to confession, and was inspired by the priest. Bergoglio studied at the archdiocesan seminary, Inmaculada Concepción Seminary, in Villa Devoto, Buenos Aires, and, after three years, entered the Society of Jesus as a novice on 11 March 1958. Bergoglio has said that, as a young seminarian, he had a crush on a girl he met and briefly doubted about continuing the religious career. As a Jesuit novice he studied humanities in Santiago, Chile. After his novitiate in the Society of Jesus, Bergoglio officially became a Jesuit on 12 March 1960, when he made the religious profession of the initial, perpetual vows of poverty, chastity and obedience of a member of the order.

In 1960, Bergoglio obtained a licentiate in philosophy from the Colegio Máximo de San José in San Miguel, Buenos Aires Province. He taught literature and psychology at the Colegio de la Inmaculada Concepción, a high school in Santa Fe, from 1964 to 1965. In 1966, he taught the same courses at the Colegio del Salvador in Buenos Aires.

Presbyterate (1969–1992) 
In 1967 Bergoglio began his theological studies at Facultades de Filosofía y Teología de San Miguel and on 13 December 1969 was ordained to the priesthood by Archbishop Ramón José Castellano. He served as the master of novices for the province there and became a professor of theology.

Bergoglio completed his final stage of spiritual training as a Jesuit, tertianship, at Alcalá de Henares, Spain, and took final, solemn vows as a Jesuit, including the fourth vow of obedience to missioning by the pope, on 22 April 1973. He was named provincial superior of the Society of Jesus in Argentina that July, for a six-year term which ended in 1979. In 1973, shortly after being named provincial superior, he had made a pilgrimage to Jerusalem but his stay was shortened by the outbreak of the Yom Kippur War. After the completion of his term of office, in 1980 he was named the rector of the Philosophical and Theological Faculty of San Miguel where he had studied. Before taking up this new appointment, he spent the first three months of 1980 in Ireland to learn English, staying at the Jesuit Centre at the Milltown Institute of Theology and Philosophy, Dublin. He served at San Miguel for six years until 1986 when, at the discretion of Jesuit superior-general Peter Hans Kolvenbach, he was replaced by someone more in tune with the worldwide trend in the Society of Jesus toward emphasizing social justice, rather than his emphasis on popular religiosity and direct pastoral work.

He spent several months at the Sankt Georgen Graduate School of Philosophy and Theology in Frankfurt, Germany, considering possible dissertation topics. He settled on exploring the work of the German / Italian theologian Romano Guardini, particularly his study of 'Contrast' published in his 1925 work Der Gegensatz. However, he was to return to Argentina prematurely to serve as a confessor and spiritual director to the Jesuit community in Córdoba. It was believed that while in Germany, he saw the painting of Mary, Untier of Knots in Augsburg and brought a copy of the painting to Argentina, but in an interview for the German newsweekly Die Zeit in 2017, Pope Francis stated that he had never been to Augsburg. As a student at the Salesian school, Bergoglio was mentored by Ukrainian Greek Catholic priest Stefan Czmil. Bergoglio often rose hours before his classmates to serve Divine Liturgy for Czmil.

Bergoglio was asked in 1992 by Jesuit authorities not to reside in Jesuit houses, because of continued tensions with Jesuit leaders and scholars, a sense of Bergoglio's "dissent," views of his Catholic orthodoxy and his opposition to theology of liberation, and his work as auxiliary bishop of Buenos Aires. As a bishop he was no longer subject to his Jesuit superior. From then on, he did not visit Jesuit houses and was in "virtual estrangement from the Jesuits" until after his election as pope.

Pre-papal episcopate (1992–2013) 
Bergoglio was named Auxiliary Bishop of Buenos Aires in 1992 and consecrated on 27 June 1992 as titular bishop of Auca, with Cardinal Antonio Quarracino, archbishop of Buenos Aires, serving as principal consecrator. He chose as his episcopal motto Miserando atque eligendo. It is drawn from Saint Bede's homily on Matthew 9:9–13: "because he saw him through the eyes of mercy and chose him".

On 3 June 1997, Bergoglio was appointed coadjutor archbishop of Buenos Aires with right of succession. Upon Quarracino's death on 28 February 1998, Bergoglio became metropolitan archbishop of Buenos Aires. In that role, Bergoglio created new parishes and restructured the archdiocese administrative offices, led pro-life initiatives, and created a commission on divorces. One of Bergoglio's major initiatives as archbishop was to increase the church's presence in the slums of Buenos Aires. Under his leadership, the number of priests assigned to work in the slums doubled. This work led to him being called the "Slum Bishop".

Early in his time as archbishop of Buenos Aires, Bergoglio sold off the archdiocese's shares in multiple banks and turned its accounts into those of a normal customer in international banks. The shares in banks had led the local church to a propensity towards high spending, and the archdiocese was nearing bankruptcy as a result. As a normal customer of the bank, the church was forced into a higher fiscal discipline.

On 6 November 1998, while remaining archbishop of Buenos Aires, he was named ordinary for those Eastern Catholics in Argentina who lacked a prelate of their own church. Major Archbishop Sviatoslav Shevchuk said that Bergoglio understands the liturgy, rites, and spirituality of Shevchuk's Ukrainian Greek Catholic Church and always "took care of our Church in Argentina" as ordinary for Eastern Catholics during his time as archbishop of Buenos Aires.

In 2000, Bergoglio was the only church official to reconcile with Jerónimo Podestá, a former bishop who had been suspended as a priest after opposing the Argentine Revolution military dictatorship in 1972. He defended Podestá's wife from Vatican attacks on their marriage. That same year, Bergoglio said the Argentine Catholic Church needed "to put on garments of public penance for the sins committed during the years of the dictatorship" in the 1970s, during the Dirty War.

Bergoglio made it his custom to celebrate the Holy Thursday ritual washing of feet in places such as jails, hospitals, retirement homes or slums. In 2007, just two days after Benedict XVI issued new rules for using the liturgical forms that preceded the Second Vatican Council, Cardinal Bergoglio established a fixed place for a weekly Mass in this extraordinary form of the Roman Rite. It was celebrated weekly.

On 8 November 2005, Bergoglio was elected president of the Argentine Episcopal Conference for a three-year term (2005–08). He was reelected to another three-year term on 11 November 2008. He remained a member of that commission's permanent governing body, president of its committee for the Pontifical Catholic University of Argentina, and a member of its liturgy committee for the care of shrines. While head of the Argentine Catholic bishops' conference, Bergoglio issued a collective apology for his church's failure to protect people from the Junta during the Dirty War. When he turned 75 in December 2011, Bergoglio submitted his resignation as archbishop of Buenos Aires to Pope Benedict XVI as required by canon law. Still, as he had no coadjutor archbishop, he stayed in office, waiting for an eventual replacement appointed by the Vatican.

Cardinalate (2001–2013) 

At the consistory of 21 February 2001, Archbishop Bergoglio was created a cardinal by Pope John Paul II with the title of cardinal priest of San Roberto Bellarmino, a church served by Jesuits and named for one; he was formally installed in that church the following 14 October. When he traveled to Rome for the ceremony, he and his sister María Elena visited the village in northern Italy where their father was born. As cardinal, Bergoglio was appointed to five administrative positions in the Roman Curia. He was a member of the Congregation for Divine Worship and the Discipline of the Sacraments, the Congregation for the Clergy, the Congregation for Institutes of Consecrated Life and Societies of Apostolic Life, the Pontifical Council for the Family and the Commission for Latin America. Later that year, when Cardinal Edward Egan returned to New York following the September 11 attacks, Bergoglio replaced him as relator (recording secretary) in the Synod of Bishops, and, according to the Catholic Herald, created "a favourable impression as a man open to communion and dialogue".

Cardinal Bergoglio became known for personal humility, doctrinal conservatism, and a commitment to social justice. A simple lifestyle contributed to his reputation for humility. He lived in a small apartment, rather than in the elegant bishop's residence in the suburb of Olivos. He took public transportation and cooked his own meals. He limited his time in Rome to "lightning visits". He was known to be devoted to St. Thérèse of Lisieux, and he enclosed a small picture of her in the letters he wrote, calling her "a great missionary saint".

After Pope John Paul II died on 2 April 2005, Bergoglio attended his funeral and was considered one of the papabile for succession to the papacy. He participated as a cardinal elector in the 2005 papal conclave that elected Pope Benedict XVI. In the National Catholic Reporter, John L. Allen Jr. reported that Bergoglio was a frontrunner in the 2005 conclave. In September 2005, the Italian magazine Limes published claims that Bergoglio had been the runner-up and main challenger to Cardinal Ratzinger at that conclave and that he had received 40 votes in the third ballot, but fell back to 26 at the fourth and decisive ballot. The claims were based on a diary purportedly belonging to an anonymous cardinal who had been present at the conclave. According to the Italian journalist Andrea Tornielli, this number of votes had no precedent for a Latin American papabile. La Stampa reported that Bergoglio was in close contention with Ratzinger during the election, until he made an emotional plea that the cardinals should not vote for him. According to Tornielli, Bergoglio made this request to prevent the conclave from delaying too much in the election of a pope.

As a cardinal, Bergoglio was associated with Communion and Liberation, a Catholic evangelical lay movement of the type known as associations of the faithful. He sometimes made appearances at the annual gathering known as the Rimini Meeting held during the late summer months in Italy. In 2005, Cardinal Bergoglio authorized the request for beatification—the third step towards sainthood—for six members of the Pallottine community murdered in the San Patricio Church massacre. At the same time, Bergoglio ordered an investigation into the murders themselves, which had been widely blamed on the National Reorganization Process, the military junta that ruled Argentina at the time.

Relations with Argentine governments

Dirty War 

Bergoglio was the subject of allegations regarding the Argentine Navy's kidnapping of two Jesuit priests, Orlando Yorio and Franz Jalics, in May 1976, during Argentina's Dirty War. He feared for the priests' safety and had tried to change their work prior to their arrest; however, contrary to reports, he never tried to throw them out of the Jesuit order. In 2005, Myriam Bregman, a human rights lawyer, filed a criminal complaint against Bergoglio, as superior in the Society of Jesus of Argentina, accusing him of involvement in the kidnapping. Her complaint did not specify how Bergoglio was involved; Bergoglio's spokesman flatly denied the allegations. The complaint was ultimately dismissed. The priests were tortured, but were found alive five months later, drugged and semi-naked. Yorio accused Bergoglio of effectively handing them over to the death squads by declining to tell the authorities that he endorsed their work. Yorio, who died in 2000, said in a 1999 interview that he believed that Bergoglio did nothing "to free us, in fact just the opposite". Jalics initially refused to discuss the complaint after moving into seclusion in a German monastery. However, two days after the election of Francis, Jalics issued a statement confirming the kidnapping and attributing the cause to a former lay colleague who became a guerrilla, was captured, then named Yorio and Jalics when interrogated. The following week, Jalics issued a second, clarifying statement: "It is wrong to assert that our capture took place at the initiative of Father Bergoglio (…) the fact is, Orlando Yorio and I were not denounced by Father Bergoglio."

Bergoglio told his authorized biographer, Sergio Rubin, that after the priests' imprisonment, he worked behind the scenes for their release; Bergoglio's intercession with dictator Jorge Rafael Videla on their behalf may have saved their lives. Bergoglio also told Rubin that he had often sheltered people from the dictatorship on church property, and once gave his own identity papers to a man who looked like him, so he could flee Argentina. The interview with Rubin, reflected in the biography El jesuita, is the only time Bergoglio has spoken to the press about those events. Alicia Oliveira, a former Argentine judge, has also reported that Bergoglio helped people flee Argentina during the rule of the junta. Since Francis became pope, Gonzalo Mosca and José Caravias have related to journalists accounts of how Bergoglio helped them flee the Argentine dictatorship.

Oliveira described the future pope as "anguished" and "very critical of the dictatorship" during the Dirty War. Oliveira met with him at the time and urged Bergoglio to speak out—he told her that "he couldn't. That it wasn't an easy thing to do." Artist and human rights activist Adolfo Pérez Esquivel, the 1980 Nobel Peace Prize laureate, said: "Perhaps he didn't have the courage of other priests, but he never collaborated with the dictatorship. …Bergoglio was no accomplice of the dictatorship." Graciela Fernández Meijide, member of the Permanent Assembly for Human Rights, also said that there was no proof linking Bergoglio with the dictatorship. She told the Clarín newspaper: "There is no information and Justice couldn't prove it. I was in the APDH during all the dictatorship years and I received hundreds of testimonies. Bergoglio was never mentioned. It was the same in the CONADEP. Nobody mentioned him as instigator or as anything." Ricardo Lorenzetti, President of the Argentine Supreme Court, also has said that Bergoglio is "completely innocent" of the accusations. Historian Uki Goñi pointed that, during early 1976, the military junta still had a good image among society, and that the scale of the political repression was not known until much later; Bergoglio would have had little reason to suspect that the detention of Yorio and Jalics could end up in their deaths.

When Bergoglio became pope, an alleged photo of him giving the sacramental bread to dictator Jorge Rafael Videla became popular in social networks. It has also been used by the newspaper Página/12. The photo was soon proved to be false. It was revealed that the priest, whose face is not visible in the photo, was Carlos Berón de Astrada. The photo was taken at the church "Pequeña Obra de la Divina Providencia Don Orione" in 1990, not during the Dirty War, and after Videla's presidential pardon. The photo was produced by the agency AFP and it was initially published by the Crónica newspaper.

Fernando de la Rúa 
Fernando de la Rúa replaced Carlos Menem as president of Argentina in 1999. As an archbishop, Bergoglio celebrated the annual Mass at the Buenos Aires Metropolitan Cathedral on the First National Government holiday, 25 May. In 2000, Bergoglio criticized the perceived apathy of society. Argentina faced an economic depression at the time, and the Catholic Church criticized the fiscal austerity of the government, which increased poverty. De la Rúa asked the church to promote a dialogue between the leaders of economic and political sectors to find a solution for the crisis. He claims that he talked with Bergoglio and proposed to take part in the meeting, but Bergoglio would have told him that the meeting was canceled because of a misunderstanding by De la Rúa's assistant, who may have declined the president's assistance. Bishop Jorge Casaretto considers it unlikely, as De la Rúa only made the request in newspaper interviews, but never made a formal request to the church.

The Justicialist Party won the 2001 elections and got the majority in the Congress, and appointed Ramón Puerta as president of the Senate. As vice president Carlos Álvarez resigned shortly before, this left an opposing party second in the order of precedence. Bergoglio asked for an interview with Puerta, and had a positive impression of him. Puerta told him that the Justicialist party was not plotting to oust De la Rúa, and promised to help the president promote the laws that may be required.

During police repression of the riots of December 2001, he contacted the Ministry of the Interior and asked that the police distinguish rioters and vandals from peaceful protesters.

Néstor and Cristina Kirchner 

When Bergoglio celebrated Mass at the cathedral for the 2004 First National Government holiday, President Néstor Kirchner attended and heard Bergoglio request more political dialogue, reject intolerance, and criticize exhibitionism and strident announcements. Kirchner celebrated the national day elsewhere the following year and the Mass in the cathedral was suspended. In 2006, Bergoglio helped the fellow Jesuit Joaquín Piña to win the elections in the Misiones Province and prevent an amendment of the local constitution that would allow indefinite re-elections. Kirchner intended to use that project to start similar amendments at other provinces, and eventually to the national constitution. Kirchner considered Bergoglio as a political rival to the day he died in October 2010. Bergoglio's relations with Kirchner's widow and successor, Cristina Fernández de Kirchner, have been similarly tense. In 2008, Bergoglio called for national reconciliation during disturbances in the country's agricultural regions, which the government interpreted as a support for anti-government demonstrators. The campaign to enact same-sex marriage legislation was a particularly tense period in their relations.

When Bergoglio was elected pope, the initial reactions were mixed. Most of the Argentine society cheered it, but the pro-government newspaper Página/12 published renewed allegations about the Dirty War, and the president of the National Library described a global conspiracy theory. The president took more than an hour before congratulating the new pope, and only did so in a passing reference within a routine speech. However, due to the pope's popularity in Argentina, Cristina Kirchner made what the political analyst Claudio Fantini called a "Copernican shift" in her relations with him and fully embraced the Francis phenomenon. On the day before his inauguration as pope, Bergoglio, now Francis, had a private meeting with Kirchner. They exchanged gifts and lunched together. This was the new pope's first meeting with a head of state, and there was speculation that the two were mending their relations. Página/12 removed their controversial articles about Bergoglio, written by Horacio Verbitsky, from their web page, as a result of this change.

Papacy (2013–present) 

Elected at 76 years old, Francis was reported to be healthy and his doctors have said his missing lung tissue, removed in his youth, does not significantly affect his health. The only concern would be decreased respiratory reserve if he had a respiratory infection. In the past, one attack of sciatica in 2007 prevented him from attending a consistory and delayed his return to Argentina for several days. Francis is the first Jesuit pope. This was a significant appointment, because of the sometimes tense relations between the Society of Jesus and the Holy See. However, Bergoglio came in second to Cardinal Ratzinger on all the ballots in the 2005 conclave, and at the time appeared as the only other viable candidate.
He is also the first from the Americas, and the first from the Southern Hemisphere. Many media reported him as being the first non-European pope, but he is actually the 11th; the previous was Gregory III from Syria, who died in 741. Moreover, although Francis was not born in Europe, he is ethnically European; his father and both of his mother's parents are from northern Italy.

As pope, his manner is less formal than that of his immediate predecessors: a style that news coverage has referred to as "no frills", noting that it is "his common touch and accessibility that is proving the greatest inspiration." On the night of his election, he took a bus back to his hotel with the cardinals, rather than be driven in the papal car. The next day, he visited Cardinal Jorge María Mejía in the hospital and chatted with patients and staff. At his first media audience, the Saturday after his election, the pope explained his papal name choice, citing Saint Francis of Assisi as "the man who gives us this spirit of peace, the poor man", and he added "[h]ow I would like a poor Church, and for the poor".

In addition to his native Spanish, he speaks fluent Italian (the official language of Vatican City and the "everyday language" of the Holy See) and German. He is also conversant in Latin (the official language of the Holy See), French, Portuguese, and English, and he understands the Piedmontese language and some Genoese.

Francis chose not to live in the official papal residence in the Apostolic Palace, but to remain in the Vatican guest house, in a suite in which he can receive visitors and hold meetings. He is the first pope since Pope Pius X to live outside the papal apartments. Francis still appears at the window of the Apostolic Palace for the Sunday Angelus.

As a Jesuit pope, he has been "making clear that a fundamental task of the faithful is not so much to follow rules but to discern what God is calling them to do. He is altering the culture of the clergy, steering away from what he has named as “clericalism” (which dwells on priestly status and authority) and toward an ethic of service (Francis says the church’s shepherds must have the “smell of the sheep,” always staying close to the People of God)."

Election 

Bergoglio was elected pope on 13 March 2013, the second day of the 2013 papal conclave, taking the papal name Francis. Francis was elected on the fifth ballot of the conclave. The Habemus papam announcement was delivered by the cardinal protodeacon, Jean-Louis Tauran. Cardinal Christoph Schönborn later said that Bergoglio was elected following two supernatural signs, one in the conclave and hence confidential, and a Latin-American couple of friends of Schönborn who whispered Bergoglio's name in Schönborn's ear; Schönborn commented "if these people say Bergoglio, that's an indication of the Holy Spirit".

Instead of accepting his cardinals' congratulations while seated on the papal throne, Francis received them standing, reportedly an immediate sign of a changing approach to formalities at the Vatican. During his first appearance as pontiff on the balcony of Saint Peter's Basilica, he wore a white cassock, not the red, ermine-trimmed mozzetta used by previous popes. He also wore the same iron pectoral cross that he had worn as archbishop of Buenos Aires, rather than the gold one worn by his predecessors.

After being elected and choosing his name, his first act was bestowing the Urbi et Orbi blessing on thousands of pilgrims gathered in St. Peter's Square. Before blessing the crowd, he asked those in St. Peter's Square to pray for his predecessor, "the bishop emeritus of Rome" Pope Benedict XVI, and for himself as the new "bishop of Rome".

Francis held his papal inauguration on 19 March 2013 in St. Peter's Square in the Vatican. He celebrated Mass in the presence of various political and religious leaders from around the world. In his homily Francis focused on the Solemnity of Saint Joseph, the liturgical day on which the Mass was celebrated.

Name 

At his first audience on 16 March 2013, Francis told journalists that he had chosen the name in honor of Saint Francis of Assisi, and had done so because he was especially concerned for the well-being of the poor. He explained that, as it was becoming clear during the conclave voting that he would be elected the new bishop of Rome, the Brazilian Cardinal Cláudio Hummes had embraced him and whispered, "Don't forget the poor", which had made Bergoglio think of the saint. Bergoglio had previously expressed his admiration for St. Francis, explaining that: "He brought to Christianity an idea of poverty against the luxury, pride, vanity of the civil and ecclesiastical powers of the time. He changed history."

This is the first time that a pope has been named Francis. On the day of his election, the Vatican clarified that his official papal name was "Francis", not "Francis I", i.e. no regnal number is used for him. A Vatican spokesman said that the name would become Francis I if and when there is a Francis II. It is the first time since Lando's 913–914 pontificate that a serving pope holds a name not used by a predecessor.

Francis also said that some cardinal electors had jokingly suggested to him that he should choose either "Adrian", since Adrian VI had been a reformer of the church, or "Clement" to settle the score with Clement XIV, who had suppressed the Jesuit order. In February 2014, it was reported that Bergoglio, had he been elected in 2005, would have chosen the pontifical name of "John XXIV" in honor of John XXIII. It was said that he told Cardinal Francesco Marchisano: "John, I would have called myself John, like the Good Pope; I would have been completely inspired by him".

Curia 

On 16 March 2013, Francis asked all those in senior positions of the Roman Curia to provisionally continue in office. He named Alfred Xuereb as his personal secretary. On 6 April he named José Rodríguez Carballo as secretary for the Congregation for Institutes of Consecrated Life and Societies of Apostolic Life, a position that had been vacant for several months. Francis abolished the bonuses paid to Vatican employees upon the election of a new pope, amounting to several million Euros, opting instead to donate the money to charity. He also abolished the €25,000 annual bonus paid to the cardinals serving on the Board of Supervisors for the Vatican bank.

On 13 April 2013, he named eight cardinals to a new Council of Cardinal Advisers to advise him on revising the organizational structure of the Roman Curia. The group included several known as critics of Vatican operations and only one member of the Curia. They are Giuseppe Bertello, president of the Vatican City State governorate; Francisco Javier Errazuriz Ossa from Chile; Oswald Gracias from India; Reinhard Marx from Germany; Laurent Monsengwo Pasinya from the Democratic Republic of the Congo; George Pell from Australia; Seán O'Malley from the United States; and Óscar Andrés Rodríguez Maradiaga from Honduras. He appointed Bishop Marcello Semeraro secretary for the group and scheduled its first meeting for 1–3 October.

Early issues 
In March 2013, 21 British Catholic peers and members of Parliament from all parties asked Francis to allow married men in Great Britain to be ordained as priests, keeping celibacy as the rule for bishops. They asked it on the grounds that it would be anomalous that married Anglican priests can be received into the Catholic Church and ordained as priests, by means of either the Pastoral Provision of 20 June 1980 or the 2009 Anglican ordinariate, but married Catholic men cannot do the same.

Fouad Twal, the Latin patriarch of Jerusalem, included a call in his 2013 Easter homily for the pope to visit Jerusalem. Louis Raphael I, the Chaldean Catholic Patriarch, asked the pope to visit the "embattled Christian community" in Iraq. In March 2021, Pope Francis went to Iraq on a first-ever papal visit to the diminishing Christian communities of Mesopotamia fallen apart after years of conflict.

On the first Holy Thursday following his election, Francis washed and kissed the feet of ten male and two female juvenile offenders, not all Catholic, aged from 14 to 21, imprisoned at Rome's Casal del Marmo detention facility, telling them the ritual of foot washing is a sign that he is at their service. This was the first time that a pope had included women in this ritual; although he had already done so when he was archbishop. One of the male and one of the female prisoners were Muslim.

On 31 March 2013, Francis used his first Easter homily to make a plea for peace throughout the world, specifically mentioning the Middle East, Africa, and North and South Korea. He also spoke out against those who give in to "easy gain" in a world filled with greed, and made a plea for humanity to become a better guardian of creation by protecting the environment. He said that "[w]e ask the risen Jesus, who turns death into life, to change hatred into love, vengeance into forgiveness, war into peace." Although the Vatican had prepared greetings in 65 languages, Francis chose not to read them. According to the Vatican, the pope "at least for now, feels at ease using Italian, the everyday language of the Holy See".

In 2013, Francis initially reaffirmed the Congregation for the Doctrine of the Faith's program to reform the U.S. Leadership Conference of Women Religious, initiated under his predecessor, Pope Benedict XVI. The New York Times reported that the Vatican had formed the opinion in 2012 that the sisters' group was tinged with feminist influences, focused too much on ending social and economic injustice and not enough on stopping abortion, and permitted speakers at its meetings who questioned church doctrine. However, in April 2015 the investigation was brought to a close. While the timing of the closure may have anticipated a visit by Francis to the U.S. in September 2015, it was noted that the sisters' emphasis is close to that of Francis.

On 12 May, Francis carried out his first canonizations of candidates approved for sainthood during the reign of Benedict XVI: the first Colombian saint, Laura of Saint Catherine of Siena, the second female Mexican saint, María Guadalupe García Zavala, both of the 20th century, and the 813 15th-century Martyrs of Otranto. He said: "While we venerate the martyrs of Otranto, ask God to support the many Christians who still suffer from violence and give them the courage and fate and respond to evil with goodness."

Synodal church 

Francis has overseen synods on the family (2014), on youth (2018), and on the church in the Amazon region (2019). In 2019 Francis's apostolic constitution Episcopalis communio allowed that the final document of a synod may become magisterial teaching simply with papal approval. The constitution also allowed for laity to contribute input directly to the synod's secretary general. Some analysts see the creation of a truly synodal church as likely to become the greatest contribution of Francis's papacy.

Consultation with Catholic laity 

A February 2014 survey by the World Values Survey cited in The Washington Post and Time shows how the unity Francis had created could be challenged. Although views about Francis personally were favorable, many Catholics disagreed with at least some of his teachings. The survey found that members of the Catholic Church are deeply divided over abortion, artificial contraception, divorce, the ordination of women, and married priests. In the same month Francis asked parishes to provide answers to an official questionnaire described as a "much broader consultation than just a survey" regarding opinions among the laity. He continued to assert Catholic doctrine, in less dramatic tone than his recent predecessors, who maintained that the Catholic Church is not a democracy of popular opinion.

Linda Woodhead of Lancaster University wrote of the survey Francis initiated, "it's not a survey in any sense that a social scientist would recognize." Woodhead said that many ordinary Catholics would have difficulty understanding theological jargon there. Nonetheless, she suspected the survey might be influential.

The Catholic Church in England and Wales  had refused to publish results of this survey; a church spokesman said a senior Vatican official had expressly asked for summaries to remain confidential, and that orders had come from the pope that the information should not be made public until after October. This disappointed many reformers who hoped the laity would be more involved in decision-making. Some other Catholic churches, for example in Germany and Austria, published summaries of the responses to the survey, which showed a wide gap between church teaching and the behavior of ordinary Catholics.

In a column he wrote for the Vatican's semi-official newspaper L'Osservatore Romano, the then-Prefect of the Supreme Tribunal of the Apostolic Signatura, American cardinal Raymond Leo Burke, who has a long-standing reputation as one of the church's most vocal conservative hard-liners, said that Francis opposed both abortion and gay marriage. The Vatican's chief spokesman, Father Federico Lombardi, also noted in the Vatican press office during the 2014 consistory meetings that Francis and Cardinal Walter Kasper would not change or redefine any dogmas pertaining to church theology on doctrinal matters.

Institute for the Works of Religion 
In the first months of Francis's papacy, the Institute for the Works of Religion, informally known as the Vatican Bank, said that it would become more transparent in its financial dealings There had long been allegations of corruption and money laundering connected with the bank. Francis appointed a commission to advise him about reform of the Bank, and the finance consulting firm Promontory Financial Group was assigned to carry out a comprehensive investigation of all customer contacts of the bank on these facts. Because of this affair the Promoter of Justice at the Vatican Tribunal applied a letter rogatory for the first time in the history of the Republic of Italy at the beginning of August 2013. In January 2014, Francis replaced four of the five cardinal overseers of the Vatican Bank, who had been confirmed in their positions in the final days of Benedict XVI's papacy. Lay experts and clerics were looking into how the bank was run. Ernst von Freyberg was put in charge. Moneyval feels more reform is needed, and Francis may be willing to close the bank if the reforms prove too difficult. There is uncertainty how far reforms can succeed.

Papal documents 
On 29 June 2013, Francis published the encyclical Lumen fidei, which was largely the work of Benedict XVI but awaiting a final draft at his retirement. On 24 November 2013, Francis published his first major letter as pope, the apostolic exhortation Evangelii gaudium, which he described as the programmatic of his papacy. On 18 June 2015, he published his first own, original encyclical Laudato si' concerning care for the planet. On 8 April 2016, Francis published his second apostolic exhortation, Amoris laetitia, remarking on love within the family. Controversy arose at the end of 2016 when four cardinals formally asked Francis for clarifications, particularly on the issue of giving communion to divorced and civilly remarried Catholics.

His motu proprios include Ai nostri tempi and De concordia inter codices. Francis issued another titled Maiorem hac dilectionem which created a new path towards canonization for certain causes.

He established two new Secretariats (top-level departments) in the Roman Curia: the Secretariat for the Economy, and the Secretariat for Communications. He simplified the process for declaring matrimonial nullity.

On 8 December 2017, Francis signed a new apostolic constitution on ecclesiastical universities and faculties Veritatis gaudium, published 29 January 2018.

A further Apostolic Exhortation, Gaudete et exsultate (Rejoice and be glad), was published on 19 March 2018, dealing with "the call to holiness in today's world" for all persons. He counters contemporary versions of the gnostic and Pelagian heresies and describes how Jesus' beatitudes call people to "go against the flow".

In February 2019, Francis acknowledged that priests and bishops were sexually abusing religious sisters. He addressed this and the clergy sex abuse scandal by convening a summit on clergy sexual abuse in Rome 21–24 February 2019. As a follow-up to that summit, on 9 May 2019 Francis promulgated the motu proprio Vos estis lux mundi which specified responsibilities, including reporting directly to the Holy See on bishops and on one's superior, while simultaneously involving another bishop in the archdiocese of the accused bishop.

On 30 September 2020, he published the apostolic letter Scripturae sacrae affectus to celebrate the 16th centenary of the death of Jerome.

On 4 October 2020 on the feast of St. Francis of Assisi, Francis published the encyclical Fratelli tutti on fraternity and social friendship, using St. Francis's own words to describe our universal brotherhood and sisterhood.

On 8 December 2020 on the Feast of the Immaculate Conception, Pope Francis published the apostolic letter Patris corde ("With a Father's Heart"). To mark the occasion, the Pope proclaimed a "Year of Saint Joseph" from 8 December 2020, to 8 December 2021 on the 150th Anniversary of the Proclamation of Saint Joseph as Patron of the Universal Church.

On 1 June 2021, Francis published the apostolic constitution Pascite gregem Dei.

Pope Francis issued the motu proprio Traditionis custodes on 16 July 2021. The document abrogated the permissions for the celebration of the Tridentine Mass previously established by Benedict XVI in the 2007 Summorum Pontificum, with Traditionis custodes instituting increased restrictions on the use of the 1962 Roman Missal. Pope Francis stated in a letter accompanying the motu proprio that emphasizing the Mass of Paul VI would bring "unity I intend to re-establish throughout the Church of the Roman Rite." On 11 February, Pope Francis met with two priests from the Priestly Fraternity of Saint Peter (FSSP) and reassured them that Traditionis Custodes did not affect their community and gave them permission, in writing, to use all the liturgical books of 1962. He also implied that Traditionis Custodes did not apply to all traditional Catholic communities, not just the FSSP.

Ecumenism and interreligious dialogue 

Pope Francis continued in the tradition of the Second Vatican Council and of the papacies since the Council in promoting ecumenism with other Christian denominations, as well as encouraging dialogue with leaders of other religions; he has also supported peace with those claiming no religious belief.

Clerical titles 

In January 2014, Francis said that he would appoint fewer monsignors and only assign those honored to the lowest of the three surviving ranks of monsignor, chaplain of His Holiness. It would be awarded only to diocesan priests at least 65 years old. During his 15 years as archbishop of Buenos Aires, Francis never sought the title for any of his priests. It is believed he associates it with clerical careerism and hierarchy, though he did not apply this restriction to clergy working in the Roman Curia or diplomatic corps, where careerism is an even greater concern.

Canonizations and beatifications 

Francis presided over the first canonizations of his pontificate on 12 May 2013 in which he canonized the Martyrs of Otranto. Antonio Primaldo and his 812 companions who had been executed by the Ottomans in 1480, as well as the religious sisters Laura of St. Catherine of Siena and María Guadalupe García Zavala – in this first canonization he surpassed the record of Pope John Paul II in canonizing the most saints in a pontificate. Francis approved the equipollent canonization of Angela of Foligno the following 9 October and then the Jesuit Peter Faber the following 17 December.

The pope approved further equipollent canonizations on 3 April 2014 for the Jesuit José de Anchieta as well as the Ursuline nun Marie of the Incarnation and bishop François de Laval. Francis canonized his two predecessors John XXIII and John Paul II on 27 April 2014 and canonized six additional saints the following 23 November. The pope canonized Joseph Vaz on his visit to Sri Lanka on 14 January 2015 and canonized a further four saints on the following 17 May; he canonized Junípero Serra on 23 September while visiting the United States and then canonized four saints on 18 October including the first married couple to be named as saints. Francis canonized Maria Elisabeth Hesselblad and Stanislaus Papczyński on 5 June 2016 and then canonized Teresa of Calcutta on 4 September; he canonized seven additional saints on 16 October. The pope canonized the two child visionaries Francisco and Jacinta Marto during his visit to Fátima in mid-2017 and canonized 35 additional saints on 15 October. Francis recognized seven saints on 14 October 2018, chief among them, his predecessor Pope Paul VI and Óscar Romero. Francis later confirmed the equipollent canonization for Bartholomew of Braga in mid-2019. On 13 October 2019, Francis canonized five new saints, including Cardinal John Henry Newman. The pope confirmed the equipollent canonization for Margherita della Metola on 24 April 2021.

The pope has also continued the practice of having beatifications celebrated in the place of the individual's origin though has presided over beatifications himself on three occasions: for Paul Yun Ji-Chung and 123 companions on 16 August 2014, his predecessor Pope Paul VI on 19 October 2014, and two Colombian martyrs on 8 September 2017. The pope has approved beatifications for a range of men and women including the likes of Álvaro del Portillo of Opus Dei (27 September 2014), the martyred archbishop Óscar Romero (23 May 2015), the prominent Polish cardinal Stefan Wyszyński (12 September 2021), and several large groups of Spanish martyrs.

Francis also confirmed his predecessor John Paul I to be Venerable on 8 November 2017.

Doctors of the Church 
On 21 February 2015, Francis signed a decree naming Saint Gregory of Narek as the 36th Doctor of the Church; he formally conferred the title upon the saint at a ceremony held in Saint Peter's Basilica on 12 April 2015 with delegations from the Armenian Catholic Church and the Armenian Apostolic Church present. On 20 January 2022, Francis provided his approval to the suggestion to name Saint Irenaeus of Lyon as the 37th Doctor of the Church, formally conferring the title upon him, along with the supplementary title Doctor unitatis ("Doctor of Unity") in a decree issued on 21 January.

Consistories 

At the first consistory of his papacy, held on 22 February 2014, Francis created 19 new cardinals. At the time of their elevation to that rank, 16 of these new cardinals were under eighty years of age and thus eligible to vote in a papal conclave. The new appointees included prelates from South America, Africa, and Asia, including appointees in some of the world's poorest countries, such as Chibly Langlois from Haiti and Philippe Nakellentuba Ouedraogo from Burkina Faso. The consistory was a rare occasion in which Francis and his predecessor, Benedict XVI, appeared together in public.

Benedict XVI also attended the second consistory on 14 February 2015, at which Francis elevated 20 new cardinals, with 15 under the age of eighty and five over the age of eighty. The pope continued his practice of appointing cardinals from the peripheries, such as Charles Maung Bo of Myanmar and Soane Patita Paini Mafi of Tonga.

Francis presided over the third consistory of his papacy on 19 November 2016, elevating 17 new cardinals. Of that total number at the time of their elevation, 13 were under the age of eighty and four were over the age of eighty. Francis continued his previous practice of elevating cardinals from the peripheries with an emphasis again on Asia and Africa, such as Patrick D'Rozario from Bangladesh and Dieudonné Nzapalainga from the Central African Republic, while also naming the first three American cardinals of his papacy and only one Curial appointment.

The pope presided over a fourth consistory for the elevation of five new cardinals on the afternoon of 28 June 2017. Each of the five were under the age of eighty, and were thus eligible to vote in a papal conclave. This consistory was noteworthy for the fact that, with the pope continuing the trend of elevating cardinals from a diverse range of areas, no cardinals elevated are of the Roman Curia, and one was a mere auxiliary bishop.

Francis presided over his fifth consistory for the elevation of 14 new cardinals on 28 June 2018. The first eleven were under the age of eighty, and therefore, were eligible to vote in a future papal conclave while the last three were over the age of eighty, and thus, ineligible to vote in a papal conclave. The pope continued the practice of naming the Vicar of Rome and a curial prefect as cardinals, while naming his substitute for the Secretariat of State in anticipation of his transferral to a curial department. The pope also continued his practice of bestowing the red hat on those from peripheries such as Madagascar, Pakistan, and Iraq, and like in 2016, created a priest as a cardinal. The consistory was also noteworthy for the fact that Francis named the papal almoner Konrad Krajewski as a cardinal, marking the consistory the first occasion where the almoner was made a cardinal. Francis himself later said that he wanted the office of almoner to receive the red hat going forward as it was an important arm of the Vatican.

On 1 September 2019, following his weekly Sunday Angelus address, Francis unexpectedly announced the appointment of 13 new cardinals. Of these, 10 appointees were under the age of 80 and would therefore become cardinal electors, besides three over 80. The new cardinals were formally installed at the consistory celebrated on 5 October 2019. Most of the new cardinals come from the peripheries of the church and developing countries. Two new appointees were from Muslim majority countries (Morocco and Indonesia), while two others were known for their work on refugee and migration issues. This action took the number of cardinal electors appointed by Francis to the College of Cardinals to about 70 out of nearly 130.

Francis created thirteen new cardinals on 28 November 2020; nine appointees were under the age of 80, therefore, could vote in a future papal conclave. The pope also nominated four cardinals over the age of 80. Most of these new appointees continued the trend that Francis adhered to, appointing the first cardinals to represent Brunei and Rwanda. Francis also nominated the first African American cardinal (Gregory), while naming the first Conventual Franciscan (Gambetti) in almost 160 years, and the first from Siena (Lojudice) since 1801. Three of his appointees were only priests upon their nomination, therefore, two (Gambetti and Feroci) received their episcopal consecration, while one (Cantalamessa) was granted a papal dispensation from it.

Year of Mercy 

With his April 2015 papal bull of indiction, Misericordiae Vultus (Latin: "The Face of Mercy"), Francis inaugurated a Special Jubilee Year of Mercy, to run from 8 December 2015, Solemnity of the Immaculate Conception of the Blessed Virgin Mary, to the last Sunday before Advent and the Solemnity of the Feast of Christ the King of the Universe on 20 November 2016.

The Holy Doors of the major basilicas of Rome (including the Great Door of St. Peter's) were opened, and special "Doors of Mercy" were opened at cathedrals and other major churches around the world, where the faithful can earn indulgences by fulfilling the usual conditions of prayer for the pope's intentions, confession, and detachment from sin, and communion. During Lent of that year, special 24-hour penance services will be celebrated, and during the year, special qualified and experienced priests called "Missionaries of Mercy" will be available in every diocese to forgive even severe, special-case sins normally reserved to the Holy See's Apostolic Penitentiary.

Francis established the World Day of the Poor in his Apostolic Letter, Misericordia et Misera, issued on 20 November 2016 to celebrate the end of the Extraordinary Jubilee of Mercy.

COVID-19 pandemic 

During the COVID-19 pandemic, Francis canceled his regular general audiences at St. Peter's Square to prevent crowds from gathering and spreading the virus, which seriously affected Italy. He encouraged priests to visit patients and health workers; urged the faithful not to forget the poor during the time of crisis; offered prayers for people with  the virus in China; and invoked the Blessed Virgin Mary under her title Salus Populi Romani, as the Diocese of Rome observed a period of prayer and fasting in recognition of the victims. The pontiff reacted with displeasure on 13 March 2020, at the news that the Vicar General had closed all churches in the Diocese of Rome. Despite Italy being under a quarantine lockdown, Francis pleaded "not to leave the ... people alone" and worked to partially reverse the closures.

On 20 March 2020, Francis asked the Dicastery for Promoting Integral Human Development (DPIHD) to create a Vatican COVID-19 Commission to express the church's concern for the crisis generated by the COVID-19 pandemic, and propose responses to the potential socio-economic challenges deriving from it.

On 27 March, Francis gave an extraordinary benediction Urbi et Orbi. In his homily on calming the storm in the Gospel of Mark, Francis described the setting: "Dense darkness has thickened on our squares, streets and cities; it looks over our lives filling everything with a deafening silence and a desolate void that paralyzes everything in its passage: you can feel it in the air, you can feel it in your gestures. ...In the face of suffering, where the true development of our peoples is measured, we discover and experience the priestly prayer of Jesus: 'may all be one'."

Francis maintains getting COVID vaccination is a moral obligation. Francis stated that people had a responsibility to look after themselves, "and this translates into respect for the health of those around us. Health care is a moral obligation", he stated.<ref>Pope Francis has said getting vaccinated against coronavirus is a "moral obligation" and denounced how naysayers had been swayed by "baseless information". The Guardian;;</ref>

In response to the economic harm created by the COVID-19 pandemic, Francis stated that now is the time to consider implementing a universal basic wage.

 Russo-Ukrainian War 
Following the February 2022 Russian invasion of Ukraine and escalation of the Russo-Ukrainian War, Francis visited the Russian embassy in Rome in what was described as an "unprecedented move." Francis called Ukrainian president Volodymyr Zelenskyy, stating his "sorrow" as the Vatican worked to find "room for negotiation." As the invasion began, the major archbishop of the Ukrainian Greek Catholic Church Sviatoslav Shevchuk cancelled a trip to visit Francis in Florence. On 25 February, the day after the invasion began, Francis would assure Shevchuk via a phone call that "he would do everything he can to help end the Ukraine conflict." During the 27 February Angelus address, Francis called for peace, saying, "Silence the weapons!" Francis also sent two high-ranking cardinals with aid to Ukraine at the beginning of March. These special envoys were the papal almsgiver, Cardinal Konrad Krajewski, and Cardinal Michael Czerny, who is head of the papal office that deals with migration, charity, justice and peace. This mission, which involved several trips, was considered a highly unusual move of Vatican diplomacy. Pope Francis consecrated both Russia and Ukraine on 25 March 2022 (see consecration of Russia).

In mid-May 2022, Francis described Russia's invasion of Ukraine as "perhaps somehow either provoked or not prevented[.]” Francis explained that this observation did not mean he was "pro-Putin": "“It would be simplistic and wrong to say such a thing. I am simply against reducing complexity to the distinction between good guys and bad guys, without reasoning about roots and interests, which are very complex.”

On 24 August 2022, Pope Francis described the killing of Darya Dugina as a case of innocents paying for the Russo-Ukrainian War. On the same day, the Ukraine's envoy to the Holy See protested against such a description of the killing, saying that Dugina was "one of ideologists of (Russian) imperialism" and therefore not an innocent victim.

In September 2022, Francis pointed out that Ukraine has a lawful right to defend itself, and that dialogue with the aggressor is necessary even when it stinks and later said that Ukrainians were noble people who were victims of savageness, monstrosities and torture.

On 2 October 2022, Francis directly addressed Putin and Zelenskyy, making an impassioned appeal to Putin to halt the "spiral of violence and death", saying that a nuclear escalation would bring "uncontrollable global consequences". Addressing Ukrainian president Zelenskyy, Pope Francis asked him to be open about "serious peace proposals" at the same time that Francis recognized that Ukraine had suffered an "aggression" and that he "pained about the suffering of the Ukrainian people".

In November 2022, Francis granted an interview to Christian magazine America. During the interview, Francis stated that generally, the Chechens and Buryats minorities were "perhaps the cruellest of Russia [but] not of Russian tradition". These remarks were strongly condemned by Russia's foreign ministry spokesperson Maria Zakharova, who expressed that the comments were "no longer Russophobia, [they] are a perversion on a level I can’t even name". Others remarked that his statement was "racist".

 Death penalty 
Francis has committed the Catholic Church to the worldwide abolition of the death penalty in any circumstance. In 2018, Francis revised the Catechism of the Catholic Church to read that "in the light of the Gospel" the death penalty is "inadmissible because it is an attack on the inviolability and dignity of the person" and that the Catholic Church "works with determination for its abolition worldwide."

In his 2020 encyclical Fratelli tutti, Francis repeated that the death penalty is "inadmissible" and that "there can be no stepping back from this position". 

On 9 January 2022, Pope Francis stated in his annual speech to Vatican ambassadors: "The death penalty cannot be employed for a purported state justice, since it does not constitute a deterrent nor render justice to victims, but only fuels the thirst for vengeance".

 Role of women 

On 11 January 2021, Francis allowed bishops to institute women to the ministries of acolyte and lector. While these instituted ministries were previously reserved to men, Catholic women already carry out these duties without institution in most of the world. Francis wrote that these ministries are fundamentally distinct from those reserved to ordained clergy.

In February 2021, Francis announced back-to-back appointments of women to take positions that were only held by men in the past. He appointed France's member of the Xaviere Missionary Sisters, Nathalie Becquart as the first co-undersecretary of the Synod of Bishops. Besides, an Italian magistrate, Catia Summaria also became the first woman Promoter of Justice in the Vatican's Court of Appeals.

 Financial corruption 
Francis was mandated by electing cardinals to sort out Vatican finances following scandals during the papacies of Pope Benedict and Pope John Paul II. He stated he is determined to end corruption in the Catholic Church but is not very optimistic due to it being a human problem dating back centuries.

 Canadian indigenous residential schools 
On 24 July 2022, Francis began an apostolic journey to Canada, expressing his sorrow, indignation, and shame over the church's abuse of Canadian indigenous children in residential schools. He apologized for the church's role in "projects of cultural destruction" and forced assimilation which culminated in the abusive system of residential schools. Francis promised a serious investigation into the history of abuse.

 Theological emphases 

In Evangelii gaudium Francis revealed what would be the emphases of his pontificate: a missionary impulse among all Catholics, sharing the faith more actively, avoiding worldliness and more visibly living the gospel of God's mercy, and helping the poor and working for social justice.

 Evangelization 

From his first major letter Evangelii gaudium (Joy to the World), Francis called for "a missionary and pastoral conversion" whereby the laity would fully share in the missionary task of the church. Then in his letter on the call of all to the same holiness, Gaudete et exsultate, Francis describes holiness as "an impulse to evangelize and to leave a mark in this world".

 Church governance 

Francis called for decentralization of governance away from Rome, and for a synodal manner of decision making in dialogue with the people. He strongly opposed clericalism and made women full members of the church's dicasteries in Rome.

 Environment 
Francis's naming of himself after Francis of Assisi was an early indication of how he shared Francis's care for all of creation. This was followed in May 2015 with his major encyclical on the environment, Laudato si' (Praise be to you).

 Option for the poor 

Francis has highly extolled "popular movements", which demonstrate the "strength of us", serve as a remedy to the "culture of the self", and are based on solidarity with the poor and the common good.

 Morality 
Cardinal Walter Kasper has called mercy "the key word of his pontificate." His papal motto Miserando atque eligendo ("by having mercy and by choosing") contains a central theme of his papacy, God's mercy, While maintaining the Catholic Church's traditional teaching against abortion, Francis, has referred to the "obsession" of some Catholics with a few issues like "abortion, gay marriage and the use of contraceptive methods" which "do not show the heart of the message of Jesus Christ."

 LGBT 

In June 2013, Francis suggested that "if a person is gay and seeks God and has good will, who am I to judge?" Later, in 2015, he declared that "the family is threatened by growing efforts on the part of some to redefine the very institution of marriage." He has also suggested that same-sex marriage "disfigures God's plan for creation."

Francis endorsed the 2015 Slovak same-sex marriage referendum which would have banned same-sex marriage and same-sex adoptions in the country.

He stated that he supports legally recognising same-sex civil unions in a statement from an interview published in October 2020; this passage was from an interview from 2019, but this passage had been cut from public releases at the time. The statement was also interpreted as supportive of LGBT adoption.
However, Vatican later clarified that his comments were taken out of context with two comments to two different questions at different times spliced together in a very misleading way. Francis has never officially pronounced support for gay civil unions. 

In January 2022, Francis said during a weekly audience that parents of gay children should offer support to their children instead of condemning them.

In an interview with Associated Press, Pope Francis said laws that criminalized homosexuality were unjust and that Catholic bishops should welcome LGBTQ people into the church rather than marginalize them, stating "we are all children of God".

Francis has been less supportive of transgender rights. He has stated support for transgender Catholics inclusion in the Church, but calls gender transitioning a sin and strongly criticizes gender studies, comparing it to nuclear arms and calling it "one of the most dangerous ideological colonizations today'.

 Religious persecution 

Francis supported the use of force to stop Islamic militants from attacking religious minorities in Iraq. In January 2018, Francis met with a group of Yazidi refugees in Europe and expressed his support for their right to freely profess their own faith without limitations. In the meeting, he also urged the international community "not to remain a silent and unresponsive spectator in the face of [your] tragedy."

 Controversies 
Since 2016, criticism against Francis by theological conservatives has intensified. One commentator has described the conservative resistance against Francis as "unique in its visibility" in recent church history. Some have explained the level of disagreement as due to his going beyond theoretical principles to pastoral discernment.

 Sexual abuse response 

As cardinal, in 2010 Bergoglio commissioned a study which concluded that Father Julio César Grassi, a priest convicted of child sexual abuse, was innocent, that his victims were lying, and that the case against him never should have gone to trial. Despite the study, the Supreme Court of Argentina upheld the conviction and 15-year prison sentence against Grassi in March 2017. Francis has admitted that the church "arrived late" in dealing with sexual abuse cases. During his papacy, a number of abuse survivors have expressed disappointment in Francis's response to sex abuse in the church, while others have praised him for his actions.

In 2015, Francis was criticized for supporting Chilean bishop Juan Barros, who was accused of covering up sex crimes committed against minors. In 2018, Francis acknowledged he had made "grave errors" in judgment about Barros, apologized to the victims and launched a Vatican investigation that resulted in the resignation of Barros and two other Chilean bishops. In 2018, Archbishop Carlo Maria Viganò published an open letter denouncing Francis's handling of sexual abuse allegations against Theodore McCarrick, accusing him of knowing about allegations that McCarrick had committed sexual abuse and failing to take action. Viganò called on the Pope to resign.

In November 2021, Francis thanked journalists for their work uncovering child sexual abuse scandals in the church, thanking journalist also for "helping us not to sweep it under the carpet, and for the voice you have given to the abuse victims."

In November 2022, French Cardinal Jean-Pierre Ricard admitted to having sexually abused a 14-year-old girl in the 1980s in Marseille. Ricard (who was named as Cardinal by Benedict XVI in 2006), said that he committed "reprehensible" acts with the girl while he was a priest. French authorities opened an investigation into the case while Francis commented that now that "everything is clearer [...] more cases like this shouldn't surprise [anyone]", and added condemnation for sexual abuse as "against priestly nature, and also against social nature".

 Theological disagreements 
 Amoris laetitia and the communion to the divorced and civilly remarried 

On a theological level, controversy arose after the publication of the apostolic exhortation Amoris laetitia, especially regarding whether the exhortation had changed the Catholic Church's sacramental discipline concerning access to the sacraments of Penance and the Eucharist for divorced couples who have civilly remarried. Francis had written that "It is important that the divorced who have entered a new union should be made to feel part of the Church." He called not for "a new set of general rules, canonical in nature and applicable to all cases," but "a responsible personal and pastoral discernment of particular cases." He went on to say: "It is true that general rules set forth a good which can never be disregarded or neglected, but in their formulation they cannot provide absolutely for all particular situations."

Four cardinals (Raymond Leo Burke, Carlo Caffarra, Walter Brandmüller, and Joachim Meisner) formally asked Francis for clarifications, particularly on the issue of giving communion to divorced and civilly remarried Catholics. They submitted five "dubia" (doubts), and requested a yes or no answer. Francis has not publicly replied. The exhortation has been implemented in different ways by various bishops around the world.

Cardinal Gerhard Müller, former prefect of the Congregation for the Doctrine of the Faith, maintained that Amoris Laetitia should only be interpreted in line with previous doctrine. Therefore, according to Cardinal Müller, divorced and civilly remarried can have access to the Sacraments of Reconciliation and the Eucharist only if they take on the duty of living in complete continence. Francis subsequently announced that dicastery prefects would be appointed for a single five-year term, and replaced Müller at the end of his term in 2017 with Luis Ladaria Ferrer. Cardinal Carlo Caffarra, one of the authors of the dubia, maintains that after Amoris laetitia "only a blind man could deny there's great confusion, uncertainty and insecurity in the Church."

In July 2017 a group of conservative clergy, academics and laymen signed a document labeled as a "Filial Correction" of Francis. The 25-page document, which was made public in September after it received no reply, criticized the pope for promoting what it described as seven heretical propositions through various words, actions and omissions during his pontificate. Capuchin Father Thomas Weinandy, ex-doctrine chief of US Bishops, wrote a letter to Francis on 31 July 2017, which he subsequently made public, in which he charged that Francis is fostering "chronic confusion", "demeaning" the importance of doctrine, appointing bishops who "scandalize" believers with dubious "teaching and pastoral practice", giving prelates who object the impression they will be "marginalized or worse" if they speak out, and causing faithful Catholics to "lose confidence in their supreme shepherd".

A defense of Amoris Laetitia came from philosopher Rocco Butiglione who accused its critics of "ethical objectivism." He said that the critics cannot deny that "there are mitigating circumstances in which a mortal sin (a sin that would otherwise be mortal) becomes a lighter sin, a venial sin. There are therefore some cases in which remarried divorcees can (through their confessor and after an adequate spiritual discernment) be considered in God's grace and therefore deserving of receiving the sacraments."

 Document on Human Fraternity 

The Document on Human Fraternity for World Peace and Living Together is a joint statement signed by Francis and Sheikh Ahmed el-Tayeb, Grand Imam of Al-Azhar, on 4 February 2019 in Abu Dhabi, United Arab Emirates. This joint statement is concerned with how different faiths can live peaceably in the same world and areas and later inspired the International Day of Human Fraternity, as acknowledged by the UN Secretary-General, António Guterres, in different occasions. Criticisms focused particularly on the passage about God's will with regard to the diversity of religions, claiming that the "pluralism and the diversity of religions, colour, sex, race and language are willed by God in His wisdom, through which He created human beings". Catholic theologian Chad Pecknold wrote that this sentence was "puzzling, and potentially problematic". Some Catholic observers tried to understand it as an allusion to the "permissive will" of God, allowing evil on earth. Pecknold wrote that the diversity of religions might also be "evidence of our natural desire to know God". Bishop Athanasius Schneider claims that Pope Francis clarified to him that he was referring to "the permissive will of God".

 Traditionis custodes and the restriction of the Tridentine Mass 

In July 2021, Francis issued, motu proprio, the apostolic letter titled Traditionis custodes, which reversed the decision of his immediate predecessor Benedict XVI in Summorum Pontificum and imposed new restrictions on the use of the Traditional Latin Mass. The letter returned to the bishops the power to grant or suppress the Latin Mass in their particular dioceses, and requires newly ordained priests to first request permission before performing the old rite, among other changes. Traditionis custodes, which Pope Francis published and came into immediate effect on 16 July, has been criticized by prelates such as Cardinals Raymond Burke, Gerhard Müller and Joseph Zen, as well as many lay faithful who attend the traditional Latin Mass. The most general criticism is that the restrictions are unnecessary, needlessly harsh, and implemented in an unjustifiably swift fashion." The motu proprio was later confirmed by Francis through the apostolic letter Desiderio desideravi.

 International policy 

Francis has regularly been accused by conservatives of having a "soft spot" for leftist populist movements. After Francis's visit to Cuba in 2015, Catholic Yale historian Carlos Eire said Francis had a "preferential option for the oppressors" in Cuba. Nevertheless, Francis remained hostile to right-wing populism.

Francis has supported the Vatican-China agreement, intended to normalize the situation of China's Catholics, which was criticized by Cardinal Joseph Zen as a step towards the "annihilation" of the Catholic Church in China. U.S. Secretary of State Mike Pompeo said cooperating with the Chinese Communist Party puts the pope's moral authority at risk. In September 2020, Pompeo urged Francis to stand against China's human rights violations. In November, Francis named China's Uyghur minority among a list of the world's persecuted peoples. He wrote: "I think often of persecuted peoples: the Rohingya [Muslims in Myanmar], the poor Uighurs, the Yazidi—what ISIS did to them was truly cruel—or Christians in Egypt and Pakistan killed by bombs that went off while they prayed in church." Zhao Lijian, the spokesman of the Foreign Ministry of China, said Francis's remarks had "no factual basis at all".

Since 2016, Francis has also been contrasted with US President Donald Trump, elected that year, with some conservative critics drawing comparisons between the two. During the 2016 United States presidential election, Francis said of Trump, "A person who only thinks about building walls, wherever they may be, and not building bridges, is not Christian. That is not the gospel." Trump responded, "For a religious leader to question a person's faith is disgraceful." Federico Lombardi said that Francis's comments were not "a personal attack, nor an indication of who to vote for".

In response to criticism from Venezuela's bishops, President Nicolás Maduro said in 2017 that he had the support of Francis. Francis met with the country's bishops in June 2017, and the Venezuelan bishops' conference president stated, "There is no distance between the episcopal conference and the Holy See." In January 2019, 20 former presidents in Latin America wrote a letter to Francis criticizing his Christmas address regarding the ongoing Venezuelan crisis for being too simplistic and for not acknowledging what they believed to be the causes of the suffering of the victims of the crisis. Francis has sought peace in the crisis without picking a side.

In 2019, during the Hong Kong protests, Francis was criticized by Catholic clergy in Hong Kong, with Cardinal Joseph Zen criticizing him for not taking a stand against China and instead being quoted as saying "I would like to go to China. I love China". Francis compared the protests in Hong Kong to those seen in Chile and in France.

 International diplomatic role 

Francis played a key role in the talks toward restoring full diplomatic relations between the U.S. and Cuba. The restoration was jointly announced by U.S. President Barack Obama and Cuban President Raúl Castro on 17 December 2014. The headline in the Los Angeles Times on 19 December was "Bridge to Cuba via Vatican," with the further lead "In a rare and crucial role, Francis helped keep U.S. talks with Havana on track and guided final deal." The pope, along with the Government of Canada, was a behind-the-scenes broker of the agreement, taking the role following President Obama's request during his visit to the pope in March 2014. The success of the negotiations was credited to Francis because "as a religious leader with the confidence of both sides, he was able to convince the Obama and Castro administrations that the other side would live up to the deal". En route to the United States for a visit in September 2015, the pope stopped in Cuba. "The plan comes amid a breakthrough for which Francis has received much credit." The Cuba visit "seals that accomplishment, in which he served as a bridge between two erstwhile enemies". According to one expert on religion in Latin America, Mario Paredes, the pope's visit to Cuba was consistent with his aim to promote an understanding of the role of the Cuban Revolution and that of the Catholic Church. When Francis was archbishop of Buenos Aires, he authored a text entitled "Dialogues Between John Paul II and Fidel Castro". John Paul was the first pope to visit Cuba. In May 2015, Francis met with Cuban leader Raúl Castro. After the meeting in Vatican City on 10 May 2015, Castro said that he was considering returning to the Catholic Church. He said in a televised news conference, "I read all the speeches of the pope, his commentaries, and if the pope continues this way, I will go back to praying and go back to the [Catholic] church. I am not joking." Castro said that, when the pope came, "I promise to go to all his Masses and with satisfaction".

In May 2014, his visit to the State of Israel, where he delivered 13 speeches, was heavily publicized. Protests against his visit resulted in an alleged arson attempt at the Dormition Abbey. The cave under the Church of the Nativity caught fire the night after his visit.

In May 2015, Francis welcomed Palestinian president Mahmoud Abbas to the Vatican. Several media outlets reported that Francis praised Abbas as "an angel of peace", though his actual words were the following: "The angel of peace destroys the evil spirit of war. I thought about you: may you be an angel of peace." The Vatican signed a treaty recognizing the state of Palestine. The Vatican issued statements concerning the hope that the peace talks could resume between Israel and Palestine. Abbas' visit was on the occasion of the canonization of two Palestinian nuns. 

On 6 June 2015, Francis visited Sarajevo, the capital city of Bosnia and Herzegovina. He urged peace during his time in the religiously diverse city, known as the "Jerusalem of Europe".

On 25 September 2015, Francis addressed the United Nations in New York City.

On 16 April 2016, he visited, together with Ecumenical Patriarch Bartholomew and Archbishop Ieronimos II of Athens, the Moria Refugee Camp on the Greek island of Lesbos, to call the attention of the world to the refugee issue. There the three Christian leaders signed a joint declaration.

In January 2017, Francis demanded the resignation of Matthew Festing, the 79th Prince and Grand Master of the Sovereign Military Order of Malta. The Pope's demand came as a response to Festing and Cardinal Raymond Leo Burke firing Baron Albrecht von Boeselager from his position in the Order of Malta. The Order, in May 2017, appointed a new leader in the person of Fra' Giacomo Dalla Torre del Tempio di Sanguinetto.

On 24 May 2017, Francis met with U.S. President Donald Trump in Vatican City, where they discussed the contributions of Catholics to the United States and to the world. They discussed issues of mutual concern, including how religious communities can combat human suffering in crisis regions, such as Syria, Libya, and ISIS-controlled territory. They also discussed terrorism and the radicalization of young people. The Vatican's secretary of state, Pietro Parolin, raised the issue of climate change and encouraged Trump to remain in the Paris Agreement. At the 2017 World Food Day ceremony, Francis reiterated that "we see the consequences [of climate change] every day" and that we "know how the problems are to be faced ... [t]hanks to scientific knowledge." He said that "the international community has drawn up the necessary legal instruments, such as the Paris Agreement, from which however some are withdrawing. There is a re-emergence of the nonchalance towards the delicate balances of ecosystems, the presumption of being able to manipulate and control the planet's limited resources, and greed for profit." 

Francis visited Ireland in 2018, in what was the first papal tour of the country since John Paul II's historic trip in 1979. While in Ireland he apologized for abuses by clergy in the United States and Ireland.

In February 2019, Francis visited Abu Dhabi, United Arab Emirates, on the invitation of Mohammed bin Zayed Al Nahyan. Francis became the first pope to hold a papal Mass on the Arabian Peninsula, with more than 120,000 attendees in the Zayed Sports City Stadium.

Francis made the plight of refugees and migrants "a core component of his pastoral work", and has defended their rights in dialogue both with Europe and with the United States. He went on to place a statue in St. Peter's Square to bring attention to the Christian imperative involved in their situation (Hebrews 13:2). In line with this policy, Francis has criticised neo-nationalists and populists who reject the acceptance of refugees.

In March 2021, Pope Francis held a historic meeting with Iraq's top Shi'ite cleric, Grand Ayatollah Ali al-Sistani, and visited the birthplace of the Prophet Abraham, Ur. Giving a message of peaceful coexistence, he and the Iraqi cleric urged the Muslim and Christian communities to work together in unity for peace.

On 9 May 2021, Francis called for peace between Israel and Palestinians and an end to clashes in Jerusalem during his Regina caeli address.

Following the Taliban takeover of Afghanistan and withdrawal of U.S. forces from the country, Francis said that the withdrawal of troops was "legitimate" but said that the process of evacuations was "not thought through" and criticized the war for having failed at nation-building. He also stated that the Vatican is in talks with the Taliban through Cardinal Pietro Parolin to discourage the Taliban on taking reprisal measures against civilians.

On 1 September 2021, Francis publicly defended the dialogue with China on the appointment of new bishops. Francis stated that uneasy dialogue was better than no dialogue at all, and emphasized in improving strained ties with the Chinese government.

On All Souls' Day, on 1 November 2021, Francis visited a war cemetery in Rome and paid tribute to fallen soldiers during the Battle of Anzio in World War II as well as at the Piave River, in Italy, during World War I. Francis also praised military casualties for "fighting for their homeland and values." and called for global peace.

On 16 April 2022, Ivan Fedorov attended Easter services in the Vatican with the Pope. Maria Mezentseva, Olena Khomenko, and Rusem Umerov were also in attendance.

Pope Francis said: "In this darkness of war, in the cruelty, we are all praying for you and with you this night. We are praying for all the suffering. We can only give you our company", our prayer, further stating "the biggest thing you can receive "Christ is risen," He said "Christ is risen" in Ukrainian."

On 25 July 2022, at the Powwow ceremonial grounds on the Cree Nation reservation in Edmonton, Canada, the Pope expressed "deep sorrow" at the Cemetery. "I humbly beg forgiveness for the evil committed by so many Christians against the Indigenous peoples", Francis said. Four chiefs escorted the pontiff to the site near the former Ermineskin Indian Residential School, and presented him with a feathered headdress after he spoke, making him an honorary leader of the community.

In a January 2023 Associated Press interview, Francis "criticized laws that criminalize homosexuality as 'unjust,' saying God loves all his children just as they are and called on Catholic bishops who support the laws to welcome LGBTQ people into the church."

 Public image 

Popular mainstream media frequently portray Francis either as a progressive papal reformer or with liberal, moderate values. The Vatican has claimed that Western news outlets often seek to portray his message with a less-doctrinal tone of papacy, in hopes of extrapolating his words to convey a more merciful and tolerant message. In the news media, both faithful and non-believers often refer to a "honeymoon" phase in which the pope has changed the tone on Catholic doctrines and supposedly initiated ecclesiastical reform in the Vatican. Media systems differ, too, not only in their coverage of Francis's stances but also in how individual events are portrayed. His 2015 trip to Cuba is a prime example. During this trip, American-based AP and British-based Reuters highlighted the religious aspect of the pope's journey while Prensa Latina, the official state media agency, depicted it as a diplomatic visit. American and British media were also more likely during this trip to show Francis interacting with regular Cubans compared to the official Cuban media, which showed Francis interacting with elites most often.

In December 2013, both Time and The Advocate magazines named the Pontiff as their "Person of the Year" in praise and hopes of reforming the Roman Curia while hoping to change the Catholic Church's doctrine on various controversial issues. In addition, Esquire magazine named him as the "Best-dressed man" for 2013 for his simpler vestments often in tune with a modern simplistic design on sartorial fashion. Rolling Stone magazine followed in January 2014 by making the Pontiff their featured front cover. Fortune magazine also ranked Francis as number one in their list of 50 greatest leaders. On 5 November 2014, he was ranked by Forbes as the fourth most powerful person in the world and was the only non-political figure in the top ranking. In December 2016, Francis again made Forbess list of "The World's Most Powerful People", ranking fifth.

In March 2013, a new song was dedicated to Francis and released in Brazilian Portuguese, European Portuguese, and Italian, titled Come Puoi ("How You Can"). Also in March, Pablo Buera, the mayor of La Plata, Argentina, announced that the city had renamed a section of a street leading up to a local cathedral Papa Francisco. There are already efforts to name other streets after him, as well as a school where he studied as a child. A proposal to create a commemorative coin as a tribute to Francis was made in Argentina's lower house on 28 November 2013. On the coins it would read, "Tribute from the Argentine People to Pope Francis." beneath his face. As of May 2013, sales of papal souvenirs, a sign of popularity, were up.

Francis presided over his first joint public wedding ceremony in a Nuptial Mass for 20 couples from the Archdiocese of Rome on 14 September 2014, just a few weeks before the start of the 5–19 October Extraordinary Synod of Bishops on the Family.

On 19 March 2016, Francis became the first pope to create an Instagram account. He broke records after having gained over one million followers in under twelve hours of the account being up. In 2019 Francis held a conference on the World Day of Social Communications highlighting the pros and cons of social media and urging users to use it as a source that liberates rather than enslaves. On 26 November 2020 Francis became the first pope to write an op-ed for The New York Times, addressing issues such as the coronavirus and the need for global solidarity. The Pontiff also used his op-ed to strongly critique those protesting COVID-19 restrictions.

In August 2021, rumors of a possible resignation arose due to health issues, but he dismissed those rumors in early September 2021, saying that he is "living a normal life." In June 2022, the Pope's health was an issue again when he had to cancel his trips to the Democratic Republic of the Congo and South Sudan. The Vatican said that the decision was at the request of the doctors treating his knee, in order to not jeopardize the results of the therapy. In an interview with Reuters in July 2022, Francis denied rumours about his resignation, saying "[it] never entered my mind. For the moment no, for the moment, no. Really!", but said that he would resign if his health made it impossible for him to run the church. During his trip to the Democratic Republic of the Congo in February 2023, Francis shifted away from rumors of an imminent resignation. In a conversation with African Jesuits, Francis said that for pontiffs to resign should not become a "fashion" and that his own resignation was "not in his agenda at the moment." Nearly one million people came for Pope Francis' mass in Kinshasa in the DRC. He addressed people to be in peace and leave weapons. He told people to “put down your arms and embrace mercy”.

 Distinctions 

 Titles and styles 
The official form of address of the pope in English is His Holiness Pope Francis; in Latin, Franciscus, Episcopus Romae. Holy Father is among the other honorifics used for popes.

 Foreign orders 
 : : Grand Collar of the Order of the Condor of the Andes (9 July 2015)
 : Order of Merit "Father Luis Espinal Camps" (9 July 2015)
 : : Order of the Smile (26 April 2016)

 Awards 
 : International Charlemagne Prize of Aachen 2016.
 "Person of the Year" by People for the Ethical Treatment of Animals (2015) for his request that all Catholics be kind to animals.
Was made an honorary Harlem Globetrotter on 7 May 2015.
Zayed Award for Human Fraternity in October 2020 for significant contributions to the service of humanity from around the world.
: Francis was awarded the Medalha Mérito Legislativo by the Congress of Brazil in November 2021.
Grand Chief Willie Littlechild gifted Pope Francis with the Indigenous Name Wapikihew (White Eagle) on behalf of the Ermineskin Cree Nation and presented him with a tradition Cree War bonnet following the Pope's apology to the Indigenous peoples in Canada at Maskwacis, Alberta on 25 July 2022.

 Honorific eponyms and dedications 

 : The Pope Francis Center for the Poor – Palo, Leyte (12 July 2015)
 Ennio Morricone composed a Mass setting (Missa Papae Francisci) named after the pope, for the occasion of the 200th anniversary of the restoration of the Jesuit order. The performance aired on Rai 5 and was attended by former Italian President Giorgio Napolitano and other dignitaries."Oscar award winner, Ennio Morricone composes 'Mass' for Pope". Rome Reports. Published: 12 June 2015.
 The composer Ludger Stühlmeyer dedicated his work Klangrede – Sonnengesang des Franziskus, for choir (SATB) and instruments – to Pope Francis (Suae Sanctitati Papae Francisci dedicat.). First performance: Capella Mariana 4 October 2015.

 Appreciation 
In the oratorio Laudato si' by Peter Reulein (music) written on a libretto by Helmut Schlegel OFM, the figure of Francis appears next to Mary, Francis of Assisi, and Clare of Assisi. In the oratorio, Pope Franziskus suggests a bridge from the crucifixion scene on Golgotha to the suffering of the present. He emphasizes the female talent and the importance of the charism of women for church and society. The texts of the encyclicals Laudato si' and Evangelii gaudium were used. The motto of the Extraordinary Jubilee of Mercy also plays a central role. The oratorio was premiered on 6 November 2016 in the Limburg Cathedral.

 Coat of arms 

 Writings 

Pope Francis has written a variety of books, encyclicals, and other writings.

 Music album Wake Up! was released on 27 November 2015 by the label Believe Digital and contains speeches by Francis and accompanying music, including rock music.

 Films 
 Documentary film 
By 2015, there were two biographical films about Francis: Call Me Francesco (Italy, 2015), starring Rodrigo de la Serna, and Francis: Pray for me (Argentina, 2015), starring Darío Grandinetti.Pope Francis: A Man of His Word is a documentary film with Swiss-Italian-French-German co-production, co-written and directed by Wim Wenders. It premiered at the 2018 Cannes Film Festival and was released in the United States on 18 May 2018. It includes extensive sections of interviews as well as stock footage from archives.

On 21 October 2020, the documentary Francesco directed by film producer Evgeny Afineevsky premiered.

On 4 October 2022, the documentary The Letter: A Message for our Earth premiered on YouTube Originals, directed by Nicolas Brown and produced by Off The Fence in partnership with Laudato Si' Movement.

 Portrayal in film 
Francis is played by Jonathan Pryce in the biographical drama film The Two Popes'' (2019), costarring with Anthony Hopkins who plays Pope Benedict XVI.

See also 

 List of current Christian leaders
 List of current heads of state and government
 List of people beatified by Pope Francis
 List of popes

Notes

References

Further reading

External links 

 Vatican: the Holy See – Vatican web site
 Vatican Web site: Official biography of Jorge Mario Bergoglio  (published on the occasion of the Conclave by the Holy See Press Office, with the information provided by the cardinals themselves)
  (Official Twitter account)
  (Official Instagram account)
  (Official Vatican YouTube page, covering the pope and related interests)
 
 

 
1936 births
20th-century Roman Catholic archbishops in Argentina
21st-century Jesuits
21st-century popes
21st-century Roman Catholic archbishops in Argentina
Anti–death penalty activists
Argentine anti-poverty advocates
Roman Catholic archbishops of Buenos Aires
Argentina–Holy See relations
Argentine cardinals
Argentine emigrants to Italy
Argentine Jesuits
Argentine people of Italian descent
Argentine people of Ligurian descent
Argentine popes
Articles containing video clips
Cardinals created by Pope John Paul II
Christian humanists
Janitors
Jesuit cardinals
Jesuit popes
Jesuit theologians
Jesuit provincial superiors
Living people
Papal names
Clergy from Buenos Aires
People of Piedmontese descent
Time Person of the Year

Popes
Roman Catholic bishops of Buenos Aires
Technicians